Tour de Cure is an Australian charity that raises money to fund cancer research, support and prevention programs. It is located in Frenchs Forest, a suburb of Sydney. Tour de Cure organises cycling tours and fundraising events across Australia and also delivers programs promoting cancer prevention to Australian schools. Its major fundraising event is its Winter Snow Ball, which has been held since 2014.

The organisation was founded in 2007 by Geoff Combes, Samantha Hollier-James and Gary Bertwistle.  In 2017 the founders were co-nominated for the 2018 NSW Australian of the Year award. They organised the first Tour De Cure Signature Tour, embarking on a fundraising bike ride from Brisbane to Sydney with 29 other riders.  Tour de Cure has funded more than 250 cancer projects and achieved 18 world-class cancer breakthroughs since 2007. Current Managing Director, Matt Clarke, joined Tour de Cure in 2016.

By February 2017 the organisation had already raised over A$3 million for the year. In 2017 Tour De Cure also reached a $31 million milestone in donations. Organisations that have received funding from Tour de Cure include leading universities, the Garvan Institute of Medical Research and the Children's Cancer Institute. In 2017 the Australian Prime Minister, Malcolm Turnbull, thanked participants in the 2017 Signature Tour, saying, "Groups like Tour De Cure continue to inspire us all."

Tour de Cure cycling events have been joined by well known cyclists including Jens Voigt, Drew Ginn, Matt Formston and Eric Bana, along with Sunrise sports presenter Mark Beretta and Weekend Sunrise weather presenter James Tobin, who perform live broadcasts daily from each Signature Tour.

References

External links 
Official website

Health charities in Australia
Cancer fundraisers
Cancer organisations based in Australia
Cycling events in Australia
Cycling organisations in Australia
Cycling in Australia
Organizations established in 2007